William Morrison Gunn (19 April 1895 – 9 April 1970) was a member of the Queensland Legislative Assembly.

Biography
Gunn was born at Mackay, Queensland, the son of the William Gunn and his wife Mary (née McLeod). He was educated at Brisbane, Gympie, and Laidley before joining the 1st AIF at the start of World War I. He was stationed with the 2nd Light Horse Brigade and saw action in Gallipoli and Palestine and in April 1917 promoted to sergeant.

In the same month as his promotion, Gunn was shot in the head and left elbow by opposing forces near Gaza. He was found to have a fractured skull and was put on the dangerously ill list. He was deemed unfit for fighting and returned home in May 1917. After his return he was a grocer at Wynnum.

On 29 October 1921 Gunn married Edith Annie Curtis (died 1971) and together had a son and a daughter. He died at Manly in April 1970.

Public life
At the 1944 Queensland state election, Gunn, for the Labor Party, won the seat of Wynnum, defeating the sitting member, Bill Dart. He held Wynnum for 22 years before retiring at the 1966 Queensland state election,

References

Members of the Queensland Legislative Assembly
1895 births
1970 deaths
Australian Labor Party members of the Parliament of Queensland
20th-century Australian politicians